Shalem may refer to:
 Shalim, the Canaanite god of dusk
 Salem, a town in the Bible
 Avinoam Shalem, art historian